Kalobe is an administrative ward in the Mbeya Urban district of the Mbeya Region of Tanzania. In 2016 the Tanzania National Bureau of Statistics report there were 14,526 people in the ward, from 13,180 in 2012.

Neighborhoods 
The ward has 6 neighborhoods.
 DDC
 Kalobe
 Maendeleo A
 Maendeleo B
 Majengo A
 Majengo Mapya

References 

Wards of Mbeya Region